Butch Pierre (born October 4, 1962) is a college basketball coach, currently serving as head coach at Northwest Florida State College. Prior to his stint at Northwest State Florida College, Pierre served as the director for player personnel for the University of Memphis Tigers men's basketball team under coach Tubby Smith during the 2017-18 season. Prior to that, he was an assistant coach for the NC State Wolfpack men's basketball team, Oklahoma State Cowboys basketball team and is also the former interim head coach of the Louisiana State University men's basketball team. Pierre, a 9-year assistant at LSU, replaced former head coach John Brady, who was fired on February 8, 2008.

Pierre was born in Darrow, Louisiana. He is a 1984 graduate of Mississippi State University with a degree in education. He received a master's degree in education from Mississippi State in 1986.

Head coaching record

References

External links
Official Bio @ LSUSports.net
Official Bio @ nwfraiders.com

1962 births
Living people
American men's basketball coaches
American men's basketball players
Basketball coaches from Louisiana
Basketball players from Louisiana
College men's basketball head coaches in the United States
Charlotte 49ers men's basketball coaches
Louisiana Ragin' Cajuns men's basketball coaches
LSU Tigers basketball coaches
Mississippi State Bulldogs men's basketball coaches
Mississippi State Bulldogs men's basketball players
Oklahoma State Cowboys basketball coaches
Point guards